The 1988 Colonial Athletic Association men's basketball tournament was held March 5–7 at the Hampton Coliseum in Hampton, Virginia. 

Richmond defeated  in the championship game, 74–71, to win their second CAA/ECAC South men's basketball tournament. The Spiders, therefore, earned an automatic bid to the 1988 NCAA tournament, where they advanced to the program's first Sweet Sixteen.

Bracket

References

Colonial Athletic Association men's basketball tournament
Tournament
CAA men's basketball tournament
CAA men's basketball tournament
Sports competitions in Virginia
Basketball in Virginia